Atherinopsoidei is a suborder of the order Atheriniformes comprising two families, both of which are restricted to the Americas.

Families
The suborder contains the following families:

 Family Atherinopsidae Fitzinger, 1873 (New World silversides)
 Family Notocheiridae Schultz, 1950 (Surf silversides)

References

Atheriniformes